Irem is a Japanese video game development company.

Irem may also refer to:
 Irem (construction company), a European building contractor
 Iram of the Pillars, a lost city in Arabia
 , a Liberia-flagged Turkish powership
 Institute of Real Estate Management, a business league headquartered in Chicago

People with the given name İrem
 İrem Altuğ (born 1982), Turkish actress
 İrem Damla Şahin (born 2000), Turkish women's footballer
 İrem Karamete (born 1993), Turkish Olympic fencer
 İrem Yaman (born 1995), Turkish taekwondo practitioner

People with the surname İrem
 İlhan İrem, (born 1955), Turkish singer-songwriter

Turkish feminine given names